
Gmina Liszki is a rural gmina (administrative district) in Kraków County, Lesser Poland Voivodeship, in southern Poland.

The gmina contains part of the protected area called Bielany-Tyniec Landscape Park.

Villages
Gmina Liszki contains the villages and settlements of Baczyn, Budzyń, Cholerzyn, Chrosna, Czułów, Jeziorzany, Kaszów, Kryspinów, Liszki, Mników, Morawica, Piekary, Rączna and Ściejowice.

Neighbouring gminas
Gmina Liszki is bordered by the city of Kraków and by the gminas of Czernichów, Krzeszowice, Skawina and Zabierzów.

References
 Polish official population figures 2006

Liszki
Kraków County